Landon Khale Tewers (born September 27, 1989) is an American musician and producer. He is a former band member of Before Their Eyes, where he was the rhythm guitarist and unclean vocalist. He is best known for being founder and the lead vocalist in the rock band The Plot in You and for his self-titled solo project.

Music career 
Tewers joined Before Their Eyes in 2008. While in the band, he started a side project named Vessels, which was later renamed to The Plot in You. He left the band in 2010, to focus on his current band. The band currently consists of Landon as vocalist, Josh Childress as guitarist, Ethan Yoder as bassist and drummer Michael Cooper.

He has released 5 albums and 1 EP with The Plot in You. Their debut album First Born was published on April 18, 2011. Their most recent album Swan Song was published on September 17, 2021. Their most popular song, "Feel Nothing" from the album Dispose released in 2018, has gone gold in the United States on November 30, 2022 and in Canada on October 4, 2022.

Landon announced in early March 2014 that he was going to release a debut solo EP named Dead Kid on April 1 2014 with "weird songs I can't use for anything else". The first single named "Ma and Pa" was published on YouTube on March 4, 2014, and the EP was eventually released on March 27, 2014. Tewers released another single track titled "I Hope You Have a Shitty Christmas" on December 24, 2014. He said he got drunk 'the other night' and wrote a Christmas song. He published the song to keep The Plot fans happy because they wouldn't release something the until October 2015. In February 2015, Landon released another song to keep providing the band's fans with music. This time it was a cover of Drake's song "Hold On, We're Going Home". Sean Macdonald (Seanzy) provided backup vocals for the cover. In the same month, he released the song "I'll Always Be Proud", "Feel You Out" and "Cleansed My Soul". In September 2015, Landon released his first part of the Ai640 trilogy, which is about a robot that escapes a lab, then sees how awful humans are, and decides the only way to save earth is to kill all humans. The second part of the trilogy named Ai640, Pt. 2 got released in December 2017 and the third and last part in February 2020 which would complete the AI640 trilogy. In December 2015, he released the Xmas EP which consists of 4 songs, among his 2014 single "I Hope You Have a Shitty Christmas". Landon released his first solo album titled Dynamite on December 9, 2016, containing 10 tracks. Withdrawals, Landon's second solo album, was released on July 19, 2019, which has 9 songs in it. In 2020, Landon made a 'covid song' because of the COVID-19 pandemic. The song is named "Rona-19" and was made as a sneer to the people who feared it, but also expressed his own concerns. His most recent EP Frontal Lobe Submission was released on January 29, 2021 with 6 songs. Rory Rodriguez from Dayseeker was featured on the song and single "Kill Me" and Gabbie Hanna featured on "F Pacing". Tewers released 3 singles in 2022. The first one was "Maddie's Song", published on April 1, which was a song for his wife's birthday. The second song is "Sink with Me", featuring blanket and the third "Over You", featuring Waynewood and JayveDade.

Landon also helps other artists producing their music and is featured in multiple songs. In 2021, he featured on the song "Overdose" by Hurtwave, a side project of Dayseeker's vocalist Rory Rodriguez and drummer Mike Karle. In 2020 he featured on Sum 41's drummer Frank Zummo's Hit the Ground on Zummo's first EP It's My War.

Personal life 
He is married to Madison Rose Tewers since 2018.

Landon currently resides in Detroit, Michigan, together with his wife.

Solo discography

Albums 

 Dynamite (2016)
 Withdrawals (2019)

Extended plays 

 Dead Kid (2014)
 Ai640 (2015)
 Xmas EP (2015)
 Ai640, Pt. 2 (2017)
 Ai640, Pt. 3 (2020)
 Frontal Lobe Submission (2021)

Singles 

 "Ma and Pa" (2014)
 "I Hope You Have a Shitty Christmas" (2014)
 "Hold On We're Going Home" featuring Seanzy (2015)
 "I'll Always Be Proud" (2015)
 "Feel You Out" (2015)
 "Creep" featuring DaBoiJ (2016)
 "What Do I Say" featuring Seanzy (2016)
 "Don't You" (2017)
 "Give You Something Too" (2018)
 "Holy Night" (2019)
 "Scattered Shit" (2019)
 "Debt" (2020)
 "Say It Ain't So" (2020)
 "Rona-19" (2020)
 "Everything I Wanted" (2020)
 Gospel Therapy (2020)
 "Kill Me" eaturing Rory Rodriguez (2021)
 "Kill Me" (acoustic) featuring Rory Rodriguez (2021)
 "Maddie's Song" (2022)
 "Sink with Me" featuring blanket (2022)
 "Over You" featuring Waynewood and JayveDade (2022)

References 

American male singers
1989 births
Post-hardcore musicians
Alternative metal singers
Alternative rock singers
Findlay, Ohio
Singers from Ohio
American people who self-identify as being of Native American descent
American heavy metal musicians
American heavy metal singers
Living people